Trident is a feature on Earth's Moon, a crater in Taurus-Littrow valley.  Astronauts Eugene Cernan and Harrison Schmitt landed about 300 m north of its rim in 1972, on the Apollo 17 mission.  They drove along the east rim of Trident during EVA 1 of the mission, in their rover.

To the south of Trident is Powell, to the west are Camelot and Horatio, and to the east is Sherlock.

The crater was named by the astronauts after a trident (three pronged spear) due to its shape.

References

External links
43D1S2(25) Apollo 17 Traverses at Lunar and Planetary Institute
Geological Investigation of the Taurus-Littrow Valley: Apollo 17 Landing Site

Impact craters on the Moon
Apollo 17